NeyNava  is a studio album by Iranian Musician Hossein Alizadeh. It was released On 23 September 1983, through Mahoor Records. it was re-issued as on Double CD with The Song of Compassion on 1994, by Kereshmeh Records in The US.

The word "NeyNava" consists of two words, Ney and Nava meaning the sound of Ney in Persian. NeyNava is a Concerto for Ney and String Orchestra and one of Alizadeh's most popular compositions.

NeyNava is a Fusion of East and West in The form of Concerto of Ney and Orchestra. Jamshid Andalibi performs the Ney solos in Album.

Track List
Note: Two tracks are not included on The Kereshmeh Records Edition: "Riders in the Field of Hope" and "Nowruz".

References

1983 albums
Iranian music
Classical albums
Hossein Alizâdeh albums